Knightia is an extinct genus of clupeid  bony fish that lived in the freshwater lakes and rivers of North America and Asia during the Eocene epoch. The genus was erected by David Starr Jordan in 1907, in honor of the late University of Wyoming professor Wilbur Clinton Knight, "an indefatigable student of the paleontology of the Rocky Mountains." It is the official state fossil of Wyoming, and the most commonly excavated fossil fish in the world.

Knightia belongs to the same taxonomic family as herring and sardines, and resembled the former closely enough that both Knightia alta and Knightia eocaena were originally described as species of true herring in the genus Clupea.

As with modern-day clupeids, Knightia spp. likely fed on algae and diatoms, as well as insects and  occasionally smaller fish.

Anatomy
In Knightia fish, rows of dorsal and ventral scutes run from the back of the head to the medial fins. They had heavy scales and small conical teeth. Their size varied by species: Knightia eocaena was the longest, growing up to 25 cm (10 in), though most specimens are no larger than 15 cm. K. alta was shorter and relatively wider, with specimens averaging between 6 and 10 cm.

Predators
A small schooling fish, Knightia made an abundant food source for larger Eocene predators. The Green River Formation has yielded many fossils of larger fish species preying on Knightia; specimens of Diplomystus, Lepisosteus, Amphiplaga, Mioplosus, Phareodus, Amia, and Astephus have all been found with Knightia in either their jaws or stomachs.

Gallery

References

External links
 
 

Clupeidae
Eocene fish
Eocene fish of North America
Symbols of Wyoming
Freshwater fish genera
Taxa named by David Starr Jordan